Nathalie F. Anderson (born 1948) is an American poet and librettist. She is a 1993 Pew Fellow, and author of several books of poetry: Following Fred Astaire, Crawlers, Quiver, Held and Firmly Bound (a chapbook), and Stain. In collaboration with composer Thomas Whitman, she authored four libretti: The Black Swan, Sukey in the Dark, Babylon and A Scandal in Bohemia.

Life
Born in Columbia, South Carolina, Anderson earned her bachelor's degree from Agnes Scott College in 1970, her master's degree from Georgia State University, and her Ph.D. degree from Emory University.

She has been teaching at Swarthmore College since 1982 and is currently a Professor in their Department of English Literature. She is also Director of their Program in Creative Writing as well as a Poet in Residence at the Rosenbach Museum & Library.

Anderson runs Philadelphia's literary event listserv, Lit-Philly.

Some of Anderson's work has been featured in various print and online journals: Atlanta Review, Poetry Daily, Fox Chase Review, Natural Bridge, The New Yorker, Paris Review, The Recorder: The Journal of American Irish Historical Society, Prairie Schooner, Denver Quarterly, Nimrod, Inkwell Magazine, The Louisville Review, and Southern Poetry Review.

On November 8, 2012, University of Pennsylvania's Kelly Writers House inaugurated the Eva and Leo Sussman Poetry Program with poetry readings by featured guest writers and instructors, Nathalie Anderson, Elaine Terranova, and Joan Hutton Landis.

Awards
 1998 Washington Prize from Word Works for Following Fred Astaire
 2000 "Slow Airs" - Grand Prize Co-Winner in Inkwell Magazine's poetry competition for 2000
 2004 "Squeeze" - Finalist for the James Hearst Poetry Prize, published in the North American Review
 2005 The Robert McGovern Publication Prize, Ashland University, Ashland Poetry Press, for Crawlers

Works

Poetry books
 
 
 
 
 Anderson, Nathalie (2017). Held and Firmly Bound. Chapin, SC: Muddy Ford Press.  
 Anderson, Nathalie (2017). Stain. Washington, D.C.: The Word Works.

Anthology appearances

Performances

References

1948 births
Emory University alumni
Georgia State University alumni
Living people
Pew Fellows in the Arts
Swarthmore College faculty
American librettists
American women poets
Women librettists
American women academics
20th-century American poets
20th-century American women writers
21st-century American poets
21st-century American women writers
Writers from Columbia, South Carolina
Poets from South Carolina